The Philippines national football team represents the Philippines in international football, governed by the Philippine Football Federation (PFF) and has been playing internationally since 1913.

Prior to World War II, the Philippines had regularly competed with Japan and the Republic of China in the Far Eastern Championship Games. So far, the national team has never qualified for the FIFA World Cup and has qualified for the AFC Asian Cup only once, in 2019. They finished second at the 2014 AFC Challenge Cup after losing to Palestine in the final.

Unlike most of Southeast Asia where football is the most popular sport, the Philippines' most popular sports are basketball and boxing, the result from the American rule. This drives away many football talents and contributes to the lack of success of football in the country. Often, the Philippines would participate in the AFF Championship and finished bottom. 

However, since the 2010 AFF Championship, the country has attempted to develop football as part of the sport's renaissance, finding more incentives to increase football development and fan support. It eventually led to the country's first major tournament participation in the 2019 AFC Asian Cup.

History

1910s–1940s: Early years

The Philippines participated at the Far Eastern Championship Games, which included football. The first edition was in 1913 and the last was in 1934. The games were the first regional football tournament for national teams outside the British Home Championship. The national team routinely faced Japan and China and at one edition the Dutch East Indies at the games. The Philippines won over China at the inaugural tournament with the scoreline of 2–1. During the 1917 edition, the national team achieved its biggest win in international football. Led by Filipino-Spanish icon Paulino Alcantara, the Philippines defeated Japan 15–2.

After the dissolution of the Far Eastern Championship Games, the national squad participated at the 1940 East Asian Games organized to commemorate the 2600th anniversary of the foundation of the Empire of Japan by Emperor Jimmu. The team finished third behind champions Japan and second placers, Manchukuo and ahead of the Republic of China.

1950s–1990s: Decline of football
In the 1950s the Philippines hosted friendlies with international-based sides, However the national team experienced lack of funding and barely received any coverage from the media. During that time talents from the national team were drawn from the Manila Football League which received substantial support from the Chinese-Filipino community. The national team's decent performance at the 1958 Asian Games, hosted in Tokyo, where they defeated Japan, 1–0 in a game which was labeled as an upset by the Japanese press.

After 1958, saw the decline of Philippine football, several key players resigned from the national team due to financial challenges for playing for the national team. National team players Ed Ocampo and Eduardo Pacheco switched to basketball, and went on playing for commercial basketball clubs where players are paid. The Philippine Congress passed Republic Act 3135 that revised the charter of the Philippine Amateur Athletic Federation which had a provision or a 60-40 rule that mandates teams to not have more than 40 percent Chinese and other players with foreign blood. Sponsors withdrew and leagues, which were mostly funded by the Chinese-Filipino community started to decline. The 60–40 rule was lifted much later during the tenure of president Johnny Romualdez of the Philippine Football Federation (PFF), after 1982 when the PFA has reorganized itself as the PFF.

The national team suffered defeats with big margins at the 1962 Asian Games in Jakarta. This includes the national team's record 15–1 defeat to Malaysia, which became the worst defeat of the national team at that time. The record was later broken by the 15–0 loss to Japan in 1967 at the qualifiers for the 1968 Summer Olympics. Foreigners were hired to serve as head coaches for the national team in an attempt to reduce big margin loses. Englishman, Allan Rogers was hired following the record defeat to Malaysia and Spaniard Juan Cutillas was likewise tasked to lead the national team following the record defeat to Japan.

In the early sixties, the Philippine Football Association partnered with the San Miguel Corporation to seek foreign assistance to train local football players and coaches and to develop the sport in the country. Coaches from the United Kingdom, Alan Rogers  and Brian Birch. After the two were relieved, Danny McClellan and Graham Adams continued their task. In 1961, San Miguel through the national football association bought in four medical students from Spain who were expert in football — Francisco Escarte, Enrique dela Mata, Claudio Sanchez and Juan Cutillas. Escarte and dela Mata left the country after one year.

In 1971, head coach Juan Cutillas recruited five foreign players to play for the national team; four Spaniards and one Chinese. The national team joined several international competitions such as the Merdeka Tournament, Jakarta Anniversary Tournament and the President Park Tournament. The team caused some upset results against the national teams of Thailand, Singapore and South Korea. The national team saw another decline after the four Spanish players left the team due to financial reasons and basketball gains more foothold over football in the country.

The national team under German head coach, Eckhard Krautzun finished fourth overall at the 1991 Southeast Asian Games, its best ever finish at the tournament. The Philippines dealt a 1–0 defeat to defending champions Malaysia at the tournament which knocked out the latter out of the tournament at just the group stage. Norman Fegidero scored the sole goal for the Philippines.

2000s 
In September 2006, the country fell to 195th on the FIFA World Rankings, its lowest ever.  By the end of the year, the Philippines moved back up to 171st overall, after a good run in the 2007 ASEAN Football Championship qualification.  They were able to win three games in a row which was a first for the Philippines and thus qualifying for the 2007 ASEAN Football Championship.  Coach at that time Aris Caslib, aimed to reach the semifinals with two wins at the group stage.  The decision came despite Philippine Football Federation president Juan Miguel Romualdez stating that they would still be underdogs in the tournament and that they mustn't raise their expectations too high, as the Philippines have only won their first ever win of the tournament during the 2004 edition.

The Philippines eventually failed to reach their target, only getting a draw in three matches.  Their poor performances led to Caslib's resignation, as well as the refusal of the PFF to register and enter the qualification stages for the 2010 FIFA World Cup.  They would be one of four nations, all from Southeast Asia not to enter after a record number of entries.  However it was revealed that the decision not to enter the 2010 as well as the 2006 World Cup qualification was made during the PFF presidency of Rene Adad, whose term ended in 2003.  Instead, the PFF wanted to focus on domestic and regional competitions.

The Philippines failed to qualify for any major competition in 2008. They missed out on the 2008 AFC Challenge Cup only on goal difference, and the 2008 AFF Suzuki Cup with an inferior goals scored record.

Dan Palami, businessman and sports patron, was appointed as team manager of the national team in 2009 by the Philippine Football Federation. The national team still receive minimal support from the government. Palami made financial investments to the team using his own personal money. Since taking responsibility over the national team, he has envisioned a plan named Project 100, which plans to make the team among the top 100 national teams in the world in terms of FIFA rankings. More foreign-born Filipinos were called up to play for the national squad.

2010s: Era of renaissance

The Philippines's campaign at the 2010 AFF Championship under Simon McMenemy's tenure was a breakthrough. Holding a primal ticket as one of two teams along with Laos that had to qualify for the tournament, the Philippines advanced from the group stage for the first time, did not concede a single defeat and their win against defending champions Vietnam in particular was considered one of the biggest upsets in the tournament's history. The match, which would later be referred by local Filipino fans as the "Miracle of Hanoi", is also considered the match that started a football renaissance in the country where basketball is the more popular sport. In the knockout stage, they had to play both their designated home and away games against Indonesia in Jakarta due to the unavailability of a stadium that passes AFF standards. The Philippines lost both games to end their campaign.

The following year, Michael Weiß became the head coach. The national team managed to qualify for the 2012 edition of the AFC Challenge Cup, the first time since qualifiers were introduced and also recorded their first ever victory in the FIFA World Cup qualification, beating Sri Lanka 4–0 in the second leg of the first preliminary round. Kuwait finished the Philippines' World Cup qualification campaign after winning over them twice in the second round.

In 2012, the Philippines qualified for the semifinals of the AFC Challenge Cup for the first time winning over former champions India and Tajikistan though they lost 2–1 against Turkmenistan in the semifinal. In the third place-playoff the Philippines won 4–3 over Palestine. The Philippines won the 2012 Philippine Peace Cup, a friendly tournament hosted at home, which was their first title since the 1913 Far Eastern Games. At the 2012 AFF Championship, the Philippines replicated their performance in 2010 by advancing to the semifinal. They lost to Singapore on aggregate by a single goal in the two-legged semifinal.

The Philippines reached the final of the 2014 AFC Challenge Cup. With a berth to the 2015 AFC Asian Cup on the line, the Philippines lost to Palestine 1–0 on May 30. The Philippines once again advance from the group stage at the 2014 AFF Championship by winning over Indonesia, the first time since the 1934 Far Eastern Games, and Laos despite their loss to Vietnam. The Philippines faced Thailand in the two-legged semifinal, coming up with a goalless draw against their opponents at home in Manila but losing the away match at Bangkok.

Thomas Dooley became the head coach of the national team. In October 2015 their 2–0 victory over Yemen in Doha, Qatar in the 2018 FIFA World Cup and 2019 AFC Asian Cup qualifiers was their first-ever World Cup qualifier victory away from home. Their campaign to qualify for the FIFA World Cup ended in the second round though they advance to the third round of the Asian Cup qualifiers.

In late 2016 the Philippines jointly hosted the group stage of the AFF Championship with Myanmar though they fail to progress from the group stage like they did in the past three editions.

Though the national team failed to qualify for the 2018 FIFA World Cup in Russia, they secured qualification for 2019 AFC Asian Cup after defeating Tajikistan, 2–1 at home in their final qualifier match. In May 2018, the national team reached 111th rank in the FIFA World Ranking making it the highest rank that the team has.

The Philippines made its historic debut in the 2019 AFC Asian Cup with a 0–1 defeat to South Korea. then a 0–3 loss to China and was edged 1–3 by Kyrgyzstan, with Stephan Schröck scoring a historic goal for the Azkals in the tournament.

2020s
Following a relatively successful debut in the Asian Cup, the Philippines began their 2022 FIFA World Cup qualification where they were grouped together with Syria, China, Guam and the Maldives. In their opening game, the Azkals met Syria at home and took an early lead, only to see the Syrians managed an outstanding comeback and smashing the Azkals 5–2 in Bacolod. Following the crushing home defeat, the Pinoys regained its pace with two away wins over Guam and the Maldives. Between these matches, the Pinoys also hosted China at home where they acquired an encouraging goalless draw, after a splendid performance by the Azkals goalkeeper Neil Etheridge which increased the team's chance. However, the Syrians once again blew the chance of the Filipinos, with the Syrians emerged with a 1–0 win over the Azkals. When COVID-19 pandemic led the games to be postponed to 2021, the Philippines had to play in a centralised venue in Sharjah. The Filipinos then won Guam 3–0, but lost 0–2 to China thus did not manage to reach the 2022 FIFA World Cup, before ending the qualification with a 1–1 draw to the Maldives. Nonetheless, the third place in their group meant the Philippines qualified for the third round of 2023 AFC Asian Cup qualifiers.

At the third round of the 2023 AFC Asian Cup qualifiers in Ulaanbaatar, the Philippines managed to draw with Yemen 0–0 and defeat the hosts Mongolia 1–0 through a last-minute goal by debutant Gerrit Holtmann but were defeated 4–0 by eventual group winners Palestine. Despite finishing second in Group B, in which the five best runner-up teams across all the groups qualify for the tournament, the Azkals failed to qualify for the 2023 Asian Cup after finishing as the worst runner-up.

Team image

Supporters

Some fans have organized themselves to support the national team, one of them is the Ultras Filipinas, which formed in 2011. The Kaholeros started out as a gathering of friends using Twitter calling for fans to watch games of the AFC Challenge Cup at the National Sports Grill in Greenbelt. The Ultras Filipinas was established when fans of Philippine Air Force F.C. and Ultras Kayas decided to form a support group for the national teams of the Philippines not necessarily just for the football team. The first outing of Ultras Filipinas was not for the national football team but for the national rugby union team. The two fan groups take alternative turns in cheering and chanting for the national team during games.

Colors

The traditional home kit is similar to the France national team; blue jersey, white shorts, and red socks.  However, in recent times, the home and away kit has either been all-blue, all-red or all-white, currently is the all-white as home jerseys. The current kit supplier of the national team is local firm, LGR Sportswear. German companies Adidas and Puma, as well as Japanese company Mizuno, has provided kits for the team in the past

Puma was the official outfitter of the national team during the 1996 AFC Asian Cup qualification. Later that year, Adidas assumed that role and outfitted the team that participated at the 1996 Tiger Cup.

For three years from March 2008, Mizuno served as the official outfitter and equipment supplier of the team. It also helped the national federation in its grassroots development program. On June 4, 2012, Puma supplanted Mizuno's role with the national team.

Local firm LGR Sportswear became the official kit provider of the national team in 2015 and a new set of kits made by LGR were unveiled to the public in on June 5 which was later used by the team at the 2018 FIFA World Cup qualifiers. The home and away kits were white and blue respectively. Filipino weave design and the three stars and the sun are present at the back of the home and away kits. The goalkeeper's kit is black and has a yellow trim on the chest area and a weave pattern with the three stars and the sun and azkals logo incorporated in the design, in front around the shoulder area. Adidas was also announced as the footwear sponsor of the team for the qualifiers

Spanish sportwear brand Kelme became the official kit provider of the national team in 2021.

Names

Under the official FIFA Trigramme the team's name is abbreviated as PHI; this acronym is used by FIFA, the AFC and the AFF to identify the team in official competitions. The team is also identified under the International Organization for Standardization (ISO) country code for the Philippines as PHL. However the team was more commonly known as the RP, the acronym for the country's official name, Republika ng Pilipinas, which the local press used when they referred to the team as the "RP Booters" or the "RP XI".  This was until late October 2010 when the Department of Foreign Affairs decided to change the official abbreviation of the country from "RP" to "PH" or "PHL", to be in line with ISO standards.  The local press have since referred to the team as either "PH/PHL Booters" or "PH/PHL XI".

The national team is referred to as the "Azkals". The name was coined when an online Philippine football community proposed the nickname Calle Azul (Spanish for Streets of Blue, referring to the color of their kit) which was modified to Azul Calle, shortened to AzCal, and finally became Azkal – a word that is similar to Filipino term Askal meaning street dog. "Azkals" became a trending topic on Twitter during the semifinals of the 2010 AFF Suzuki Cup.

They are also known as the "Tri–Stars" which is derived from the three stars on the Philippine flag, although this nickname is not frequently used.

Home stadium
During the early years of the Philippine national team, they played their home matches at the Manila Carnival Grounds. By 1934 it became the site of the Rizal Memorial Sports Complex. One of the facilities within the complex is the 12,000 capacity national stadium, known as the Rizal Memorial Track and Football Stadium or simply the Rizal Memorial Stadium.  Since its opening, it has been the home venue of the Philippine national team until May 2015 where they declared the 25,000 seater and Philippine Sports Stadium in Bocaue, Bulacan as their new home. However, due to disappointing attendance numbers in PSS and RMS and an impressive crowd for Ceres–Negros F.C.'s run to the 2017 AFC Cup, the Philippine Football Federation decided to make Panaad Stadium as the national team's home again for the 2019 AFC Asian Cup qualifiers.

The RMS has also become a hub for track and field. The continued use for athletics along with poor maintenance has deteriorated the stadium and the 1991 Southeast Asian Games was the last time it was used for international football matches.  In early 2009, the Philippine Sports Commission planned to transform it to a modern football stadium which would make it usable by the national team for international matches.

The national team also held official international matches at the Cebu City Sports Center in Cebu City, and at the Barotac Nuevo Plaza Field in Barotac Nuevo, Iloilo.

Fixtures and results

The following is a list of match results in the last 12 months, as well as any future matches that have been scheduled.

2022

2023

Personnel
Updated as of March 17, 2022

Current technical staff

Management

Coaching history

One of the earlier head coaches of the national team was Dionisio Calvo. Foreign coaches of American, Argentinean, English, German, Scottish, Spanish, and Swedish nationality have managed the national team. Juan Cutillas has managed the team in at least four non-consecutive tenures (1969–1978, 1981–1984, 1996–2000 and 2008–09).

Thomas Dooley led the national team to its best finish in a tournament sanctioned by the Asian Football Confederation and FIFA by leading the team to second place at the 2014 AFC Challenge Cup. The past three coaches, Simon McMenemy, Michael Weiß and Thomas Dooley, also made some strides at the regional level leading the team to the semifinals at the AFF Suzuki Cup (2010, 2012 and 2014 editions respectively), the top football tournament in Southeast Asia. Eckhard Krautzun also led the national team to the semifinals, its best finish at the 1991 Southeast Asian Games, before football became an under-23 tournament at said multi-sporting event.

Caretaker managers are listed in italics.

 Dionisio Calvo (1930–1954)
 Luis Javellana (1956)
 Ramon Echevarria Sr. (1958)
 Fernando Giménez Álvarez (1962)
 Alan Rogers (1962–1963)
 Danny McLennan (1963)
 Orlando Plagata (1965)
 Emilio Pacheco (1967)
 Juan Cutillas (1967–1972)
 Florentino Broce (1973–1974) 
 Juan Cutillas (1975–1978)
 Bernhard Zgoll (1980)
 Juan Cutillas (1981–1984)
 Alberto Honasan (1987)
 Carlos Cavagnaro (1989)
 Consorcio Manresa (1991)
 Eckhard Krautzun (1991–1992)
 Mariano Araneta (1993) 
 Rodolfo Alicante (1993)
 Noel Casilao (1993–1996)
 Juan Cutillas (1996–2000)
 Rodolfo Alicante (2000)
 Masataka Imai (2001)
 Sugao Kambe (2002–2003)
 Aris Caslib (2004–2007)
 Norman Fegidero (2008)
 Juan Cutillas (2008–2009)
 Aris Caslib (2009)
 Des Bulpin (2009–2010)
 Simon McMenemy (2010)
 Michael Weiß (2011–2014)
 Thomas Dooley (2014–2018)
 Marlon Maro (2017)
 Terry Butcher (2018)
 Scott Cooper (2018)
 Anto Gonzales (2018)
 Sven-Göran Eriksson (2018–2019)
 Scott Cooper (2019)
 Goran Milojević (2019)
 Scott Cooper (2019–2021)
 Stewart Hall (2021–2022)
 Thomas Dooley (2022)
 Josep Ferré (2022–2023)
 Barae Jrondi (2023–)

Players

Current squad

Caps and goals updated as of January 2, 2023, after the match against .

Recent call-ups

The following players have been called up for the Philippines within the past 12 months.
 

 

COV Withdrew due to COVID-19
INJ Withdrew due to an injury
PRE Included in the preliminary squad
RET Retired from the national team
SUS Serving suspension

Player records

Players in bold are still active.

Most appearances

Top goalscorers

Competition  records

FIFA World Cup
The Philippines has never qualified for the FIFA World Cup. The national team entered the 1950 FIFA World Cup qualification but withdrew without playing a single game. The Philippines had intended to enter the 1962 edition but did not push through with the plan. The country's entry to the 1966 edition was not accepted due to its association not being able to pay the registration fee for the qualifiers and the national team withdrew from the 1974 FIFA World Cup qualification just as they did in the 1950 qualifiers. The national team made its first participation in a FIFA World Cup qualifiers for the 1998 edition.

At the 2002 FIFA World Cup qualifiers, Yanti Barsales made the first goal for the Philippines at a FIFA World Cup qualifier against Syria.

The national team did not enter the qualifiers for the next succeeding editions until the 2014 FIFA World Cup qualifiers, about 10 years later. The national team secured their first victory in a World Cup qualifier against Sri Lanka, 4–0.

Olympic Games

AFC Asian Cup

The Philippines qualified once for the Asian Cup, in 2019. For the 2011 and the 2015 AFC Asian Cup, the Philippines attempted to qualify for the tournament through the AFC Challenge Cup. The Philippines would have been invited to host the 1968 Asian Cup, a tournament in which it did not qualify for, if Iran withdrew as hosts.

Asian Games

AFC Challenge Cup
The AFC Challenge Cup was organized as a route for nations classified as "emerging" or "developing" as a sole route to qualify for the Asian Cup. The Philippines is among these nations
and participated at the inaugural 2006 AFC Challenge Cup. After a qualification phase was introduced the Philippines failed to qualify for the next two succeeding editions in 2008 and 2010. The Philippines qualified for the 2012 AFC Challenge Cup where the finished third. Phil Younghusband was the Golden Boot winner of the edition scoring six goals in the final tournament. The team reached the finals of 2014 edition of the tournament settling for second place after losing to Palestine in the finals. The AFC Challenge Cup tournament was dissolved after the 2014 edition.

Far Eastern Games
Out of the ten football tournaments held in ten editions of the Far Eastern Games, The Philippines only won the inaugural 1913 edition despite fielding American, Spanish and British players violating tournament rules in that edition. The team was nevertheless named champions. China was awarded champions of the nine other editions of the tournaments. At the 1917 Far Eastern Games, the Philippines recorded its biggest victory in an international match to date, which was the 15–2 win against Japan. FC Barcelona player, Paulino Alcántara was part of the national squad.

AFF Championship
The Philippines participated in every edition of the AFF Championship except the 2008 edition in which the team failed to qualify for the final tournament. Their first match in the tournament was a 0–5 defeat handed by Thailand in 1996 edition. Freddy Gonzalez scored the first goal for the Philippines in the tournament in a 1–3 defeat, also to Thailand in the 1998 edition. Emelio Caligdong made a brace in the national team's 2–1 victory against Timor Leste in the 2004 edition. The victory was the first for the Philippines in the AFF Championship.

The national team fared poorly during the first seven editions of the AFF Championship from 1996 to 2008 losing 19 out of 21 matches. The Philippines' worst defeat at the tournament was the 1–13 match against Indonesia at the 2002 AFF Championship which was also remains the highest scoreline in the tournament as of 2020. The national team made to its first semi-finals at the 2010 AFF Championship.

Southeast Asian Games
The senior national team managed to reach the semi-finals of the football tournament of the Southeast Asian Games before the football was made into an under-23 tournament.

Minor tournaments
The Philippines participated at numerous minor friendly tournaments. Aside from other national teams, the Philippine nationals also faced selection teams and club sides from other nations at some of these tournaments. The team made a podium finish, placing not below third place, at the Japanese Empire-sanctioned East Asian Games in 1940, the Long Teng Cup (2010, 2011) held in Taiwan, and all three editions of the Philippine Peace Cup (2012, 2013 and 2014) hosted by the home country.

Head-to-head record
Last match updated was against  on January 2, 2023

See also
 Football in the Philippines
 Ultras Filipinas

Men's
 Philippines national under-23 football team
 Philippines national under-21 football team
 Philippines national under-19 football team
 Philippines national under-17 football team

Women's
 Philippines women's national football team
 Philippines women's national under-20 football team

Notes

References

External links
 Philippine Football Federation
 Philippines at FIFA.com
 Philippines – World football elo ratings at ELOratings.net 
 
 
 

 
Asian national association football teams